Rudolf Nieuwenhuys (born 11 June 1927, Amsterdam) is a Dutch neuroanatomist, Emeritus Professor of Neuroanatomy and Comparative Neuroanatomy at the Catholic University in Nijmegen. He is recognised for his contribution to the field of comparative neuroanatomy. Professor Nieuwenhuys graduated from the Faculty of Medicine of the University of Amsterdam in 1955 and in 1960 obtained a PhD at the same institute with the dissertation Het Telencephalon der Actinopterygii. He started his research in the field of neuroanatomy in The Netherlands Institute for Neuroscience, Amsterdam, The Netherlands.  He is author of important works in neuroanatomy including The Central Nervous System of Vertebrates, The Human Central Nervous System and Towards a New Neuromorphology.

He was awarded the Academy Medal of the Royal Netherlands Academy of Arts and Sciences (KNAW) in 1998.

Publications
 Nieuwenhuys, Rudolf (1985) Chemoarchitecture of the Brain. Springer, Heidelberg. DOI:10.1007/978-3-642-70426-0 
 Nieuwenhuys, Rudolf; ten Donkelaar, Hans J.; Nicholson, Charles (1998). The Central Nervous System of Vertebrates. Springer, Berlin. DOI: 10.1007/978-3-642-18262-4
 Nieuwenhuys, Rudolf; Voogd, Jan; van Huijzen, Chris (2008) The Human Central Nervous System. 4th edition. Springer, Berlin. DOI: 10.1007/978-3-540-34686-9
 Nieuwenhuys, Rudolf; Puelles, Luis (2016) Towards a New Neuromorphology. Springer, Cham. DOI: 10.1007/978-3-319-25693-1

References

 
 Desfilis, Ester; Medina, Loreta. (2016) Rudolf Nieuwenhuys "Science is tremendously susceptible to fashion" [interview]. Mètode 2016 - 89. Online only. The secrets of the brain - Spring 2016.  https://metode.org/issues/monographs/en-rudolf-nieuwenhuys.html
 https://www.worldcat.org/wcidentities/lccn-n78042676

1927 births
Living people
20th-century Dutch physicians
Dutch anatomists
20th-century Dutch anatomists
Dutch neurologists
University of Amsterdam alumni
Academic staff of Radboud University Nijmegen
Knights of the Order of the Netherlands Lion
Scientists from Amsterdam